6070 Rheinland is a paired Nysian asteroid from the inner regions of the asteroid belt, approximately  in diameter. It was discovered on 10 December 1991, by German astronomer Freimut Börngen at the Karl Schwarzschild Observatory in Tautenburg, Germany. The asteroid was named after the Rhineland, a region in western Germany. The stony asteroid has a rotation period of 4.27 hours.

Orbit and classification 

Rheinland is a member of the Nysa family, the largest asteroid family that can be divided further into subfamilies with different spectral properties.

It orbits the Sun in the inner main-belt at a distance of 1.9–2.9 AU once every 3 years and 8 months (1,347 days; semi-major axis of 2.39 AU). Its orbit has an eccentricity of 0.21 and an inclination of 3° with respect to the ecliptic. The body's observation arc begins with a precovery taken at the Palomar Observatory in March 1956, more than 35 years prior to its official discovery observation at Tautenburg.

Naming 

This minor planet was named after the Rhineland, a region in western Germany. The official naming citation was published by the Minor Planet Center on 17 March 1995.

Physical characteristics 

Rheinland has been characterized as an S- and Q-type asteroid by Pan-STARRS photometric survey. It is also characterized as a stony S-type asteroid in the SDSS–MFB taxonomy (Masi Foglia Binzel).

Rotation period and poles 

Several rotational lightcurves of Rheinland have been obtained from photometric observations since 2009. Analysis of the best-rated lightcurve gave a rotation period of 4.27333 hours with a consolidated brightness amplitude between 0.40 and 0.58 magnitude.

Published in 2014, a modeled lightcurve gave a period 4.273715 hours, as well as a two spin axes of (110.0°, −60.0°) and (290°, −60.0°) in ecliptic coordinates (λ, β).

Diameter and albedo 

According to a detailed study published in 2017, Rheinland measures 4.4 kilometers in diameter and its surface has an albedo of 0.20, while the Collaborative Asteroid Lightcurve Link also assumes an albedo of 0.20 and derives a similar diameter of 4.36 kilometers based on an absolute magnitude of 14.17.

Asteroid pair 

Rheinland forms an asteroid pair with asteroid , a newly found class of two unbound bodies on nearly identical orbits around the Sun. Asteroid pairs have not been studied in detail yet. In the past, the members of a pair (or cluster if more than two members) had very small relative velocities and may have been a binary asteroid until they became gravitationally unbound and continued on separate orbits. Other asteroid pairs may have resulted from a collisional breakup of a parent body similar to the process that formed the asteroid families.

It is thought that this pair was created due to rotational fission (YORP effect) some  years ago. The other body of this pair, has a diameter of approximately 2.09 kilometers, an albedo of 0.213, and is an assumed Q-type asteroid.

Notes

References

External links 
 Formation of asteroid pairs by rotational fission, Nature (2010) 
 Lightcurve Database Query (LCDB), at www.minorplanet.info
 Dictionary of Minor Planet Names, Google books
 Asteroids and comets rotation curves, CdR – Geneva Observatory, Raoul Behrend
 Discovery Circumstances: Numbered Minor Planets (5001)-(10000) – Minor Planet Center
 
 

006070
Discoveries by Freimut Börngen
Named minor planets
19911210